John Ayers (April 14, 1953 – October 2, 1995) was a National Football League offensive lineman from 1977 through 1987. During that span, he appeared in two Super Bowls: Super Bowl XVI and Super Bowl XIX for the San Francisco 49ers. Ayers was a key contributor on the final 89-yard drive that led to the play that has been immortalized as "The Catch" in the 1982 NFC Playoffs versus the Dallas Cowboys.

John Ayers played college football at West Texas A&M University. He was also a member of the 1987 Denver Broncos team that lost Super Bowl XXII, but did not appear in that game.

Ayers also served for a brief period as the figurehead President of Bill Watts' Universal Wrestling Federation.

Ayers was diagnosed with liver cancer and died on October 2, 1995.

His daughter, Jolee, was a scholarship basketball player at Texas Tech University.

References

External links
 St. Petersburg Times
 http://vault.sportsillustrated.cnn.com/vault/article/magazine/MAG1125154
 http://sportsillustrated.cnn.com/football/features/superbowl/archives/16/
http://johnayers86.blogspot.com/

1953 births
1995 deaths
People from Carrizo Springs, Texas
American football offensive guards
West Texas A&M Buffaloes football players
San Francisco 49ers players
Denver Broncos players
Deaths from liver cancer
Players of American football from Texas